The King's Highway was a roughly  road laid out from 1650 to 1735 in the American colonies. It was built on the order of Charles II of England, who directed his colonial governors to link Charleston, South Carolina, and Boston, Massachusetts.

The section north of New York City, laid out on January 22, 1673, became the Upper Boston Post Road. The road was finally completed in 1735. Much of the Post Road is now U.S. Route 1 and U.S. Route 20.

The King’s Highway Historic District in New Jersey covers U.S. Route 206 and New Jersey Route 27, connecting Lawrenceville with Kingston through Princeton.

In Pennsylvania, much of the route is now U.S. Route 13. (In Philadelphia, Route 13 becomes Frankford Avenue.)

Through Maryland, the King's Highway largely follows U.S. Route 1.

From Virginia southward, the modern U.S. 17 has many segments that follow the old King's Highway.

Mail delivery in the Northeast

Herman Moll's 1729 "Post Map" described the route:

Boston Post Road
The Boston Post Road was a system of mail-delivery routes between New York City and Boston that evolved into the first major highways in the United States. Some routes followed trails in use by Native Americans long before Europeans arrived. Some of these important native trails had been used long enough that they were two feet below the surrounding woodland.

Following a trail known as the Pequot Path, the Upper Post Road was first laid out on January 1, 1673. Used by post riders to deliver the mail, it was later widened and smoothed so that horse-drawn wagons or stagecoaches could use it. During the 19th century, turnpike companies took over and improved pieces of the road. Large sections of the various routes are still called the King's Highway and Boston Post Road.

Route of the King's Highway

Boston, MA
New Haven, CT
Fairfield, CT
Greenwich, CT
Rye, NY
Kingsbridge, NY
New York City
Newark, NJ
Elizabeth, NJ
Rahway, NJ
Perth Amboy, NJ
New Brunswick, NJ
Princeton, NJ
Lawrenceville, NJ
Trenton, NJ
Bordentown, NJ
Burlington, NJ
Philadelphia, PA
Chester, PA
Wilmington, DE
New Castle, DE
Baltimore, MD
Annapolis, MD
Alexandria, VA
Fredericksburg, VA
Bowling Green, VA
King William, VA
Williamsburg, VA
Yorktown, VA
Hampton, VA
Norfolk, VA
Suffolk, VA
Edenton, NC
New Bern, NC
Wilmington, NC
Georgetown, SC
Charleston, SC

Extension to Maine

In 1761, then-Postmaster General Benjamin Franklin ordered milestones placed along the 1673-established route from Boston to Saco, Maine, initially, then all the way to Machias, as a northern extension of King's Highway.

As part of his duties, Franklin conducted inspections of the roads that were used for delivering mail as settlements along the coast increased. One method of charging for mail service was by mileage, so Franklin invented an odometer to measure mileage more accurately. The King's Highway, as a result, morphed into the Post Road.

Gallery

See also
List of roads and highways
Washington-Rochambeau Revolutionary Route
Assunpink Trail
King's Highway Historic District

References

External links
King’s Road
Locating the Old Wagon Roads
Washington-Rochambeau Revolutionary Route

Highways in the United States
Historic trails and roads in the United States
U.S. Route 17